Guy Ébrard (13 July 1926 – 17 April 2017) was a French politician. He served as a member of the National Assembly from 1958 to 1968, representing Basses-Pyrénées (now known as Pyrénées-Atlantiques). He also served as the mayor of Oloron-Sainte-Marie from 1965 to 1976.

References

1926 births
2017 deaths
People from Béarn
Radical Party (France) politicians
Deputies of the 1st National Assembly of the French Fifth Republic
Deputies of the 2nd National Assembly of the French Fifth Republic
Deputies of the 3rd National Assembly of the French Fifth Republic
Mayors of places in Nouvelle-Aquitaine